The Devil You Know is an American documentary television program broadcast on the Investigation Discovery (ID) cable television channel. The program debuted on June 15, 2011, when it was one of five new crime documentary television series released on ID in summer 2011. The program aired for three seasons, with its final episode airing on December 19, 2013.

Summary
The program explores stories of crime mysteries and secret lives of men and women who are supposedly law-abiding citizens but in reality are people with deadly intentions causing pain to their loved ones. Members of families and friends of those affected are interviewed in order to present first-hand accounts of the lives of people who have been betrayed and hurt by these criminals.

Notable cases covered by the programme include Stacey Castor, Gary Ridgeway, and Michael Mastromarino.

See also
Culture of North Carolina
The Exorcist- both the film and novel mentioned in the series
Evangelical Christianity

References

External links
Trailer
IMDb

2011 American television series debuts
2013 American television series endings
2010s American documentary television series
2010s American crime television series
2010s American television news shows
Investigation Discovery original programming
Television series by Entertainment One